Senovica ( or ) is a settlement in the Municipality of Šmarje pri Jelšah in eastern Slovenia. It lies just west of the town of Šmarje on the regional road towards Celje. The railway line from Grobelno to Rogatec runs through the settlement. The area is part of the historical Styria region. The municipality is now included in the Savinja Statistical Region.

References

External links
Senovica at Geopedia

Populated places in the Municipality of Šmarje pri Jelšah